A list of Western films released from 1950 to 1954.

TV series of 1950s
see, List of TV Westerns

1950
Western